John James Pinder (1 December 1912 – 19 August 2004) was an English professional footballer who played as a full-back.

Career
Born in Acomb, Pinder spent his whole career at York City, with whom he made a total of 221 appearances and scored four goals. He was famed for his tough-tackling no-nonsense defending and truly was one of his era. He also was capped by England at schoolboy level.

Pinder died on 19 August 2004 at the age of 91 in York District Hospital after suffering a perforated bowel.

References

1912 births
2004 deaths
Footballers from York
English footballers
England schools international footballers
Association football fullbacks
York City F.C. players
English Football League players